Dominic John Hyam (born 20 December 1995) is a Scottish professional footballer who plays as a defender for Blackburn Rovers.

Career
Hyam was born in Leuchars, Fife, whilst his father was based in the Royal Air Force base in the area. The family lived in the area for 18 months before returning to live in the south of England.

Reading
Hyam started his career with Reading in 2008 at the age of 12, progressing through the youth system to become an integral part of the youth team that reached the Premier Academy League final in 2013. In November 2013, he signed his first professional contract with the club on a three-year deal.

In February 2015, Hyam joined Conference South side Hemel Hempstead Town on an initial one-month loan, which was later extended until the end of the season.

On 26 November 2015, Hyam joined Basingstoke Town on loan 2 January 2016. On 1 February, transfer deadline day, Hyam moved to Dagenham & Redbridge on loan until 5 March 2016.

On 9 May 2016, Hyam was one of 15 Reading youth-team players offered a new contract by the club, with conformation of his new deal being signed coming on 1 July 2016.

On 31 August, Hyam joined Portsmouth on loan until 8 January 2017.

On 23 March 2017, Hyam joined Aldershot Town on loan until the end of the season.

On 12 May 2017, Reading announced that Hyam, and nine others, would be leaving the club on the expiration of the contract at the end of June.

Coventry City
On 24 May 2017, Coventry City announced the signing of Hyam on a two-year contract, beginning on 1 July 2017.

Hyam entered into new contract discussions with Coventry at the end of the 2017–18 season. He signed a new two-year contract in December 2019.

Blackburn Rovers
On 28 August 2022, Hyam signed for Blackburn Rovers on a three-year contract for an undisclosed fee. He scored his first goal for the club on 13 September in a 2–0 win against Watford.

Career statistics

Honours
Coventry City
EFL League One : Champions
EFL League Two play-offs: 2018

References

External links

1995 births
Scotland under-21 international footballers
Scottish people of English descent
Living people
English footballers
Association football defenders
Reading F.C. players
Hemel Hempstead Town F.C. players
Basingstoke Town F.C. players
Dagenham & Redbridge F.C. players
Portsmouth F.C. players
Coventry City F.C. players
English Football League players
National League (English football) players
People from Leuchars